Blondell is both a surname and a given name. Notable people with the name include:

Joan Blondell, American actress
Gloria Blondell, American actress 
Ruby Blondell, classicist
Tina Blondell, American artist
Blondell Reynolds Brown, American politician
Blondell Wayne Tatum

See also
Blondel (disambiguation)